Vodice is a municipality and village in Tábor District in the South Bohemian Region of the Czech Republic. It has about 200 inhabitants.

Administrative parts
Villages and hamlets of Babčice, Domamyšl, Hájek, Malešín and Osikovec are administrative parts of Vodice.

References

Villages in Tábor District